The Mississauga Steelheads are a junior ice hockey team in the Ontario Hockey League, based in Mississauga, Ontario, Canada. The Steelheads play their games at the Paramount Fine Foods Centre in Mississauga.

History 
The OHL originated in Mississauga with the Mississauga IceDogs. The IceDogs played in Mississauga from 1998 to 2007 being purchased by Ottawa Senators owner Eugene Melnyk in 2006. Following the 2006-2007 season, Melnyk sold the Icedogs who moved to St Catherines to become the Niagara IceDogs. At the same time Melynk moved the Toronto St. Michael's Majors to Mississauga to become the Mississauga St. Michael's Majors. The Majors played in Mississauga from 2007-2012, also hosting the 2011 Memorial Cup. Following the 2012 season Melnyk sold the Majors franchise to Elliott Kerr of Mississauga's Landmark Sport Group. As a part of the sale, the Majors identity was returned to St. Michael's College, allowing the team to move forward under the fan-selected "Steelheads" moniker.

The Steelheads struggled in their first season in 2012–13 finishing last in the OHL Central Division and 8th overall in the Eastern Conference before losing to the Belleville Bulls in 6 games in the first round. Before the 2013–14 the Steelheads drafted 15 year old Sean Day. Day had applied for and been granted Exceptional Player Status to be able to be drafted into the OHL at 15 years old. In the 2013–14 season the Steelheads again finished last in the OHL Central Division and 8th in the Eastern Conference, this time being swept by the number one ranked Oshawa Generals in four games in the first round of the 2014 OHL Playoffs. In 2014–15 the Steelheads finished in 4th in the Central Division ahead of the Sudbury Wolves but missed the 2015 OHL Playoffs finishing five points back. In 2015–16  thanks to strong performances by a trio of top 2016 NHL Draft picks (Alexander Nylander, Michael McLeod, Nathan Bastian) the Steelheads finished above .500 for the first time and ended the season in 7th in the Eastern Conference standings, (4th in their division). Again though the Steelheads would fall in the 1st Round losing to the Barrie Colts in 7 games.

2016–17 was the best season currently in Mississauga Steelheads history. Backed by continued strong performances by Bastian and McLeod as well as a breakout 44 goal season from 2017 1st Round Draft Pick Owen Tippett, the Steelheads won their first Central Division Title. Entering the 2017 OHL Playoffs in the 2nd seed in the Eastern Conference the Steelheads defeated the Ottawa 67's in 6 games in the 1st Round before defeating the Oshawa Generals in 5 games in the 2nd Round. In the Eastern Conference Finals the Steelheads swept the Peterborough Petes in 4 games to win their first Bobby Orr Trophy in franchise history. The Steelheads would fall in the J. Ross Robertson Cup Finals in 5 games to the Erie Otters.

In 2017–18 Mississauga returned to the bottom of the Eastern Conference ending the season in 7th place, (4th in the Central Division). The Barrie Colts once again defeated the Steelheads in the 1st Round of the Playoffs, this time in 6 games. In 2018–19 Mississauga was the best team of a weak bottom half of the OHL Eastern Conference finishing in 5th place but 20 points back of Sudbury in 4th. In the playoffs the Wolves easily swept Mississauga in 4 games. The 2019–20 OHL season was cancelled before completion of the regular season, the J. Ross Robertson Cup or the 2020 Memorial Cup in Kelowna. At the time of cancellation the Steelheads sat in 6th place in the OHL Eastern Conference with a record of 27-29-4-1 but 17 points up on 9th place, which would have guaranteed the Steelheads a 7th playoff appearance in 8 seasons.

Uniforms and mascot
The primary logo for the Steelheads displays a Steelhead trout below the word Mississauga with a maple leaf after it. The Steelheads colours are blue & white. The secondary logo features the Port Credit lighthouse within an M, representing the city landmark.

The Steelheads' blue and white uniforms bear a striking resemblance to those of the nearby Toronto Maple Leafs of the NHL; their home sweaters are white with blue striping and collars, while their road sweaters are blue with white striping and collars.

The team mascot is named Sauga. The name was created during a fan contest during the summer of 2012, when the organization asked its fans to create a name for the new Steelheads mascot.

Championships

Division titles
2016–17 Emms Trophy – Central Division

Conference titles
2016-17 Bobby Orr Trophy –  Eastern Conference

J. Ross Robertson Cup
2017 Finalists vs. Erie Otters

Season-by-season results

Regular season
Legend: OTL = Overtime loss, SL = Shootout loss

Playoffs
2012-13 Lost to Belleville Bulls 4 games to 2 in conference quarter-finals.
2013-14 Lost to Oshawa Generals 4 games to 0 in conference quarter-finals.
2014-15 Out of playoffs.
2015-16 Lost to Barrie Colts 4 games to 3 in conference quarter-finals.
2016-17 Defeated Ottawa 67's 4 games to 2 in conference quarter-finals.  Defeated Oshawa Generals 4 games to 1 in conference semi-finals.  Defeated Peterborough Petes 4 games to 0 in conference finals.  Lost to Erie Otters 4 games to 1 in OHL finals.
2017-18 Lost to Barrie Colts 4 games to 2 in conference quarter-finals.
2018-19 Lost to Sudbury Wolves 4 games to 0 in conference quarter-finals.
2019-20 Cancelled
2020-21 Cancelled
2021-22 Defeated Barrie Colts 4 games to 2 in conference quarter-finals.  Lost to Hamilton Bulldogs 4 games to 0 in conference semi-finals.

Coaches
2012–2016: James Boyd
2016–present: James Richmond

Captains
 2012–13 – Stuart Percy
 2013–14 – Brett Foy
 2014–15 – Bryson Cianfrone
 2015–16 – Joshua Burnside
 2016–17 – Michael McLeod
 2017–18 – Michael McLeod, Nicolas Hague
 2018–19 – Cole Carter
 2019–20 – Liam Ham
 2020–21 – none
 2021–present – Ethan Del Maestro

NHL alumni
List of Steelheads alumni to play in the National Hockey League (NHL):

Nathan Bastian
Trevor Carrick
Dylan DeMelo
Nicolas Hague
Thomas Harley
Mason Marchment
Spencer Martin
Michael McLeod
Ryan McLeod
Alexander Nylander
Stuart Percy
Owen Tippett

See also
List of ice hockey teams in Ontario

References

External links 
 

Ice hockey clubs established in 1996
Ontario Hockey League teams
Sport in Mississauga
Ice hockey teams in Ontario